Faye Leung (born 18 March 1979) is the former senior principal dancer of the Hong Kong Ballet (HKB), from 1996 to 2008. She speaks fluent English, Cantonese and Mandarin. She appeared in many leading roles, in such classic works as Swan Lake, The Nutcracker, Cinderella, Romeo and Juliet and The Merry Widow.

Biography 
Faye was born in Shanghai as the only child of a writer and a former businesswoman. She started dancing at the age of four years and was soon recruited by the Shanghai Junior Academy of Arts for further ballet training. At ten, she joined and trained at the Shanghai Ballet School. In 1995, Faye won a special award and First Prize in the Shanghai International Ballet Competition (Teenage Group) as well as a scholarship acknowledging her outstanding ballet technique, unique presentation style and musical talent. She represented China on tours to North Korea and the United States.

In 1999, she entered the "Marie Claire Best Model Competition", and won the "Best PN Look" and "Colour 18 Girls" awards. And in 2002 she was listed in Eve Magazine as one of "Eve's 10 Most Envied Women".

Career 

Faye joined the Hong Kong Ballet in October 1996, after completing her scholarship in 1995–1996, and was promoted to principal dancer in the 2001 season and senior principal in 2005.

Faye has danced all the leads in the classics, including Swan Lake, The Sleeping Beauty, Giselle, The Nutcracker and Romeo and Juliet. A variety of choreographers have also created roles specially for her, such as Princess Jade in Legend of the Great Archer, Valeria in Spartacus (Irek Mukhamadov), Lady White in The White Snake (Domy Reiter-Soffer) and roles in Tango Ballet Tango (Stephen Jefferies), Turandot (Natalie Weir), and Dreams of Tenderness and Solitude (David Allan).

In 2004, she was invited to perform at the Shanghai International Ballet Competition and the International Ballet Festival of Miami. In 2005, she was nominated for the Prix Benois de la Danse for her characterization of Princess Jade in Legend of the Great Archer and performed The Nutcracker pas de deux at the Gala performance at the Bolshoi Theatre in Moscow. In August 2005, she danced at the Ballet Festival in Vail, Colorado.

2009 dismissal from Hong Kong Ballet 
Leung was dismissed from the Hong Kong Ballet with immediate effect on the evening of Friday 23 January 2009. She was in rehearsal for the "All Bach" mixed bill programme which was to be held in three weeks at the Hong Kong Arts Festival, and which marked HKB's 30th anniversary. She was advised of the dismissal by board member Linda Fung, who said it was a board decision. When she asked why she was being dismissed, Leung says Fung told her that the board felt she and the company were "going in different directions". Leung, who has said she has "done nothing wrong" then retracted a termination agreement she feels was signed under duress, and is asking for a proper explanation of her dismissal. After the dismissal, Leung broke her usual silence and became more open to media attention. In its January 2010 issue, local cultural magazine Muse published an in-depth interview with Leung regarding this difficult period in her career.

Career after the Hong Kong Ballet 
In August 2009, Leung appeared as guest artist in HKB's Cinderella as a "farewell performance". In September 2009, she appeared in a music video for the new single "1+1" of local singer Jonathan Wong Chee Hynn (王梓軒).

, she is the lead actress in The House of Dancing Water, a water-based show in City of Dreams, Macau, directed by Franco Dragone (Cirque du Soleil, Celine Dion: A New Day). The show includes high-caliber acrobats from all over the world. Leung plays a princess who is captured by an "Evil Queen" character.

Reviews 

"The leading ladies fare well, Faye Leung as Valeria, has a lyrical quality in her dancing and makes a sensuous lover for Spartacus, especially in their pas de deux in 'imagination'." 
South China Morning Post by Edwin Lung (29 March 2005)

"Nobuo fujino and Faye Leung danced outstandingly well as the Nutcracker Prince and grown up Clara - his impeccably - landed double tours en I'air and her double fouettes in the grand pas de deux were particularly impressive, as was their execution of the many lifes." 
www.ballet.co.uk by Natash Rogai (January 2005)

"With their Nutcraker pas de deux, Hong Kong Ballet's Leung Fei and Fujino Nobuo supplied the evening's knock-your-socks-off finale -- and a superb example of creating a unified, coherent aesthetic effect." 
International Ballet Festival Gala Highlights by Tony Guzman (24 September 2004)

"The dancers were under a fair amount of pressure as closing the programme is an honour and usually reserved for the most impressive number. I am happy to report that they danced magnificently. At the end of the coda there was an audible gasp before the audience broke out into spontaneous applause. They received a standing ovation. The comments on the choreography ( Stephen Jefferies ) and dancing were all very positive. Most refreshing to here what great CLASSICAL dancers came from the HK Ballet ! Astonishing for me to hear all this praise when our at home critic does nothing but criticise ! The Turandot pas de deux at the second performance was also well received as by now Faye and Nobby were the audience favourites. the comments were that it was wonderful to see how such classical dancers could also move so well in a contemporary/neo classical piece." 
Rashna Homji (20 September 2004)

"I remember in 1997 sitting up and saying ...Who IS that girl?... the moment she stepped on stage. It is always exciting to spot a young dancer of outstanding talent and watch them develop over the years ... often there are disappointments, but Leung, a long-limbed dancer of effortless extensions and creamy plastique, has more than fulfilled her promise. It was fascinating to see her again in what was her first major role - in the scene where she tries to get her morose husband and fellow-wife to dance with her to Gershwin's I Got Rhythm, she simply lights up the stage. " 
www.ballet.co.uk by NatashaR on The Last Emperor (18 September 2004)

"... European and Asian artist had big success but the surprise of the evening was the couple Leung Fei and Fujino Nobuo from Hong Kong Ballet. Their perfection was incomparable and they deserve the standup ovation give by the audience." 
Roger Salas on Miami International Ballet Festival (16 September 2004)

"... The most glorious classical performance of the evening came from the Hong Kong Ballet's Fujino Nobuo and Leung Fei, in a version of The Nutcracker choreographed by the company's artistic director Stephen Jeffries. Nobuo's leaps were as awe-inspiring as they were effortless while Fei personified beauty even as she executed a dozen perfect pirouettes in a row at breakneck speed." 
The Herald (Miami) by Celeste Fraser Delgado on Miami International Ballet Festival (16 September 2004)

"... But the best of classical ideals -- so right and light -- came from Hong Kong Ballet's Leung Fei and Fujino Nobuo, in a freshly tuned up Nutcracker love duet." 
Sun Sentinel by Guillermo Perez on Miami International Ballet Festival (15 September 2004) 
 
"Act one's fifty minutes features a beautiful pas de deux in scene two by Faye Leung and Han Po. Prima ballerina Leung produces excellent extension and Po provides excellent life support." 
A Rapturous Affair in The Green Room Dance Critic (San Jose) by Daniel G. Lam on Great Archer (19 May 2004)

"... On the opening night, Faye Leung was graceful in the leading role of Clara. In the Act 2 pas de deux, Leung danced with a steely strength but without much radiance." 
South China Morning Post by Kevin Ng on Nutcraker (December 2003) 
 
"... particularly memorable was a bouncy trio and the second lyrical duet, which was well danced by Faye Leung and Nobuo Fujino." 
South China Morning Post by Kevin Ng on Ballet Extravaganza (30 May 2003) 
 
"In the Hong Kong Ballet production, Faye Leung, a lovely dancer with an exquisite classical line, reprised her Princess Aurora role for the second or third time. As Princess Aurora, Leung (Fei)... shine splendidly in the third act grand pas de deux. With the Act II introduction of her handsome Prince Charming, I was convinced that Hong Kong Ballet had come of age as a company that could withstand the rigors of the classic repertoire. The climatic event of Sleeping Beauty is Prince Florimund and Princess Aurora’s grand pas de deux. In this production it was extremely well crafted from somewhat standard material. The interpretation by the two principals had an air of confidence, and with their excellent dancing it would be not look out of place on any of the world’s great opera house stages. Leung grew in self-assurance and skill throughout the ballet from her initial entrance in Act I, and performed this final duet with radiance. Her solo and coda were executed with technical precision and provided and opportunity to display here striking classical line... This was the best dancing I think I’d seen from either of these fine artists." 
Dance Journal/HK by Graeme Collins on Sleeping Beauty (April 2002) 
 
"Faye Leung's lyric portrayal of Juliet transformation from bright-eyed innocent to grief-stricken lover is poetic and her technique strong and admirable... Romeo... His macabre pas de deux with the seemingly lifeless Juliet, followed by a similarly chilling dance by Leung, brings production to a deeply emotional conclusion." 
South China Morning Post by Christopher Coleman on Romeo and Juliet (30 January 2002) 
 
"The high point the night however ... and certainly the most enthusiastically applauded set piece ... was the Arabian Dance performed by Fei Leung and Nobuo Fujino, whose performance would have been equally remarkable judged as ballet or gymnastics." 
South China Morning Post by Robin Lynam on The Nutcracker (19 December 2001) 
 
"Also worth noticing was a sinuous Arabian pas de deux by Leung Fai and Jason Wilcock. The pair made (Steven) Jefferies' innovation and gruelling choreography their own, and were far and away the standout of the Act Two divertissmennts." 
Sunday Morning Post by Jason Gagliardi on The Nutcracker (20 December 1998) 
 
"Leung Fei, as his (Pu Yi's) Second Empress, has an innate lyricism visible even in this limited choreography." 
"Emperor's New Clothes" in Newsday by Sylviane Gold on The Last Emperor (15 May 1998)

References

External links 
Faye Leung's Alive Not Dead homepage

Living people
Prima ballerinas
Chinese ballerinas
1979 births
People from Shanghai